The following is a list of Amanda Award winners within the main categories awarded at the annual Norwegian International Film Festival since the award's initiation in 1985. In 1993, the so-called "Nordic Amanda" honoured cinematic achievements from all the Nordic countries. This practice was discontinued the following year, but an award for best Nordic film was awarded until the year 2000.

Categories 
The list of categories is incomplete.

Best Film (Norwegian) 

1985–2004 the Amanda Award for Best Norwegian Film was given to the director. In 2005 this practice was changed, and the award is now given to the film's producer.

Best Director 
The award for best director has only been awarded since 2005. Before this the best film award, which is now given to the producer, was given to the director.

People's Amanda

Best Actor

Best Actress

Best Supporting Role 
Given intermittently up until 2007, starting in 2008 this award is given out in both a male and female category.

Best Actor in a Supporting Role

Best Actress in a Supporting Role

Best Sound Design

Best Children's Film

Best Original Screenplay

Best Short film

Best Documentary

Best Film (International)

The Amanda Committee's Golden Clapper (technical award)

The Amanda Committee's Honorary Award

Discontinued awards

Best Film (Nordic)

Best Television Drama

References

External links 
 Full list of winners.
 Official site.
 The Amanda Awards on IMDb.

Norwegian film awards
Amanda Award
Norwegian International Film Festival